Don Mitchell (born 1961) is Professor of Cultural Geography at Uppsala University (since 2017) and Distinguished Professor Emeritus of Geography in the Maxwell School, Syracuse University. From an academic household in California, he is a graduate of San Diego State University (1987), Pennsylvania State University (1989) and received his Ph.D. from Rutgers University in 1992, working with Neil Smith. He taught at the University of Colorado, Boulder before joining Syracuse in the late 1990s. 

In 1998, he became a MacArthur Fellow, and in 2008 a Guggenheim Fellow. He was awarded the Anders Retzius Medal from the Swedish Society for Anthropology and Geography in 2012.

Contributions
Considered an influential Marxist and radical scholar, he is best known for his work on cultural theory, showing how landscapes embody strong links to histories of struggle, oppression, and unacknowledged labor involved in their creation and maintenance. He has applied this to the history of immigrant labor in California's agricultural landscapes, public and privatized public spaces like shopping malls, and public parks where homeless people are threatened or evicted People's Geography Project. He works on labor struggles, human rights and justice. 

He is also known for an editing technique, particular useful for book manuscripts or other long (10,000 words or more) texts, as well as for texts having undergone multiple revisions over a long period of time. The writer prints out the piece, rereads and makes edits,  then retypes the entire text (except for block quotes, which can be pasted from a previous draft). The technique eliminates the incoherence resulting from cutting and pasting, and it compels the writer to reread, revise, and even eliminate prose that no longer works. This technique appears arduous but has the reputation of saving time over the long term.

 Don Mitchell. 2020.  "Mean Streets: Homelessness, Public Space, and the Limits of Capitalism. University of Georgia Press. Mean Streets review
 Don Mitchell. 2012. They Saved the Crops: Labor, Landscape, and the Struggle over Industrial Farming in Bracero-Era California. University of Georgia Press.
 Kenneth Olwig and Don Mitchell (eds.) 2009. Justice, Power and the Political Landscape London: Routledge.
 Lynn Staeheli and Don Mitchell, 2008. The People’s Property? Power, Politics, and the Public. New York: Routledge.
 Don Mitchell. 2003. The Right to the City: Social Justice and the Fight for Public Space.
 Don Mitchell. 2000. Cultural Geography: A Critical Introduction. Blackwell.  
 Don Mitchell. 1996. The Lie of the Land: Migrant Workers and the California Landscape. Minneapolis: University of Minnesota Press

References

American geographers
Syracuse University faculty
MacArthur Fellows
Living people
1961 births